Dobri dol is a village in northwestern Bulgaria. It is located in Lom Municipality, Montana Province. The most notable landmark in the village is the local Eastern Orthodox Monastery of Dobri dol.

See also
List of villages in Montana Province

Villages in Montana Province